Ashraf Abbasi was a Pakistani politician and the first female Deputy Speaker of the National Assembly of Pakistan. She was a close supporter of the Pakistan Peoples Party (PPP) and its leaders Zulfikar Ali Bhutto and Benazir Bhutto. She was also a member of the West Pakistan Assembly from 1962 until 1965. She joined the PPP and won from her constituency in 1970.

Personal life
Abbasi received her secondary education from DJ College Sindh in 1940. She also studied at the Lady Hardinge Medical College in Delhi. She obtained her MBBS degree from the Dow Medical College Karachi. Abbasi opened her clinic in Larkana. She also served at Civil Hospital Larkana. She participated in the promotion of education. She died on 4 August 2014 in the village of Waleed, Larkana. She was the mother of three sons, including Safdar Ali Abbasi, who became a PPP senator, Munawar Ali Abbasi(Ex-MPA Sindh Assembly), and Akhtar Ali Abbasi.

Career
Abbasi was a member of the West Pakistan Assembly from 1962 to 1965. Later, she joined the PPP, winning a National Assembly seat in 1970.
She became the first woman deputy speaker of the National Assembly, serving from 1973 to 1977 and again from 1988 to 1990. She also served as the chairperson of the Shaheed Zulfikar Ali Bhutto Institute of Science and Technology, Larkana campus, and was a member of the Allama Iqbal Open University, Islamabad, and University of Sindh, Jamshoro, syndicates. She was also a member of the constitution committee. She established the Mothers Trust in 1996 to help poor women. Abbasi wrote her biography titled Jaikey Halan Haikliyoon ("The Women Who Walk Alone").

Publications
 Jaikey Halan Haikliyoon ("The Women Who Walk Alone").

References

External links
 Ashraf Abbasi at Woman.com.pk

2014 deaths
Deputy Speakers of the National Assembly of Pakistan
D. J. Sindh Government Science College alumni
Dow Medical College alumni
Pakistan People's Party politicians
People from Larkana District
Sindhi people
20th-century Pakistani women politicians
Women members of the National Assembly of Pakistan
20th-century Pakistani writers
20th-century Pakistani women writers
Women legislative deputy speakers
Sindh MPAs 1977